Coed Cwm Einion is a woodland to the east of the village of Furnace, in Ceredigion,  west Wales. It is designated a Site of Special Scientific Interest, covering . The Afon Einion river flows on the northern side of the Coed Cwm Einion woodland.

Flora

The woodland extends up a steep gorge, and is approximately 69% broad-leaved deciduous woodland. A Tilio-Acerion ravine forest, it contains ash (Fraxinus excelsior) and sessile oak, rowan, downy birch trees and the small-leaved lime (Tilia cordata). Species found in the woodland include Tunbridge filmy-fern (Hymenophyllum tunbrigense), hay-scented buckler-fern (Dryopteris aemula), Plagiochila atlantica and Parmotrema robustum, a lichen which is critically endangered, and marsh hawk's-beard (Crepis paludosa). Numerous shrubs found in the wood include, ivy, honeysuckle, hazel and bramble and are a food source for mammals such as Dormice and birds. Sheep grazing has affected the woodland, particularly on the northern side, and gaps in the canopy affect about 5-10% of the area of the woodland.

Hiking route
There is a  hiking route through the area, which passes through Coed Cerrig-mawr and ascends Mynydd Coronwen before descending sharply.

See also
 List of Sites of Special Scientific Interest in Ceredigion

References

Sites of Special Scientific Interest in Ceredigion